Solidago confinis, commonly called southern goldenrod, is a North American species of flowering plants in the family Asteraceae. It is native to California, southern Nevada, and Baja California.

Solidago confinis is a perennial herb sometimes as much as 200 cm (80 inches) tall, with a thick, woody underground caudex. One plant can produce up to 320 small yellow flower heads in a showy, branching array at the top of the stem.

References

confinis
Flora of the Western United States
Flora of Baja California
Plants described in 1882
Flora without expected TNC conservation status